The Qing Shan King Sacrificial Ceremony (青山王祭) is a centuries-old festival that is held annually in Wanhua, Taipei, Taiwan. It is held between the 20th and 22nd of October (based on Lunar Calendar) and is meant to celebrate the birthday of the Deity, Ling An Zun Wang (靈安尊王) or Qing Shan King (青山王). During this festival, the Deities and Bodhisattvas of several other temples (including Qingshui Temple) will be invited to visit and attend the celebration within Wanhua District.

There will be procession by invited guest Deities and Bodhisattvas in Wanhua neighborhood for two nights, then they will attend the birthday celebration of Qing Shan King. The purpose of procession within Wanhua District is to cleanse and eliminate any evil spirit or unholy presence that might cause or bring bad luck and sufferings to the local community. During this visit, all windows and doors must be shut to prevent evil spirits from entering the locals’ households. There are three different tour routes, the first route runs from Huan He Road to Zhong Hua Road, the second starts from Wanhua Station and the last route begins from Ting Han Kou Road in Ximending. The parade usually lasts throughout the night and ends around 3 or 4am.

Between 2-3 million pieces of a traditional biscuit known as "Xian Guang Bing" are given out during each celebration.

References

Religion in Taipei
Buddhist festivals in Taiwan
Autumn events in Taiwan